Though it did not produce silverware, FC Barcelona's 2007–08 season would mark a period of change within the club, having many firsts and lasts. Most importantly, this would be Ronaldinho's last season with the club, being displaced by the coming of Arsenal legend Thierry Henry. This season also marked the breakthrough of young talent Bojan Krkić into the first team, as well as the emergence of Lionel Messi as one of the team's key players. On the other hand, this would be Lilian Thuram's last season as a professional footballer, as well as Gianluca Zambrotta's last with the club.

Events

 25 June: Thierry Henry moves from Arsenal to Barcelona for €24 million.
 29 August: Nike will supply Barcelona until the 2017–18 season.
 22 September: The Camp Nou turns 50 years old with a celebration full of music, light, and colour.
 22 September: A large reform for the Camp Nou was revealed, with plans to make the Camp Nou bigger, with a retractable roof and better facilities.
 20 October: Bojan becomes the youngest ever player to score for the club in La Liga.
 26 October: Barça opens a community centre for children in Senegal.
 20 March: Barcelona are knocked out of the Copa del Rey at the semi-final stage by Valencia.
 8 May: The club announces that head coach Frank Rijkaard will leave the club when his contracts expires at the end of June, and that Pep Guardiola will replace him.

Players

Squad information

The squad has reasonably changed in the summer transfer window. The biggest addition was Thierry Henry, with a transfer fee of €24 million. That equals the transfer fee paid for Samuel Eto'o in 2004, but just below the €30 million paid for Ronaldinho in 2003. Other additions were Eric Abidal, Yaya Touré, and Gabriel Milito . On the other end, some important players that were often used last season have left the club, such as, Giovanni van Bronckhorst and Ludovic Giuly. Barcelona still used a great number of players developed in its youth system, 9 of 23, and have two new additions this season: Giovani dos Santos and Bojan (17 years old, the youngest player on the squad).

Most of the players have contracts beyond this end of season, but Deco, an important player, has his contract ending in 2008. The captain is still Carles Puyol, who is from Barcelona's youth system, plays in the first squad since 1999 and currently is the player with the most appearances (268). Currently, the highest scorer is Ronaldinho, with 80 goals. Also Ronaldinho, from August of this year, has a European passport. On mid-October, Samuel Eto'o received Spanish nationality, making him an EU player. The only non-EU player is Yaya Touré. Because Spain ratified the Cotonou Agreement in 2007, however, Touré is now considered an EU player, as his native country of Ivory Coast is a signatory to that agreement, and the 2003 Kolpak ruling extended the Bosman ruling to nations with an associate trading relationship with the EU.

Transfers

In

Total spending:  €65.5 million

Out

Total income:   €11.7 million.

Expenditure:  €53.8 million.

Squad stats

Víctor Valdés and Eric Abidal have been the only two players that have started all the matches (excepting Copa Catalunya, when Barcelona didn't use the same players as for the other competitions). Previously, Gianluca Zambrotta and Yaya Touré started all the matches until they got injured. Oleguer replaced Zambrotta and Andrés Iniesta replaced Touré. Giovani dos Santos and Bojan were the substitute forwards, while Santiago Ezquerro played only in the Copa Catalunya, as well as Eiður Guðjohnsen playing once. Thierry Henry started the majority of the matches when Samuel Eto'o got injured. He scored his first hat trick wearing Barça's jersey, and he's the second goal scorer with four goals. Ronaldinho missed three matches due to an injury.

Disciplinary record

Club

Coaching staff

This season will be the fifth consecutive season for Frank Rijkaard as Barcelona's manager. Even though Barça did not win any major competition last season, club president Joan Laporta confirmed Rijkaard's presence for this season. All staff from last season, except doctor Gil Rodas, are remaining.

Kit

|
|
|

Other information

Competitions

La Liga

Classification

Results by round

UEFA Champions League

Matches

Competitive

Friendly

See also
FC Barcelona
2007–08 UEFA Champions League
2007–08 La Liga
2007–08 Copa del Rey

References

External links

 English Speaking FC Barcelona Supporters
 ESPNsoccernet: Barcelona Team Page 
 Footballdatabase.com: FC Barcelona (Spain) profile
 UEFA Champions League
 Web Oficial de la Liga de Fútbol Profesional
 

Barcelona
FC Barcelona seasons